Acronicta subornata is a moth of the family Noctuidae. It is found in the Korean Peninsula,  China and Japan (Honshu).

External links
Korean Insects

Acronicta
Moths of Asia
Moths described in 1889